ACC Coach of the Year may refer to:
ACC Football Coach of the Year
ACC Men's Basketball Coach of the Year